Sonic Temple is the fourth studio album by British rock band The Cult, released on 10 April 1989. The album features some of the band's most popular songs, including "Fire Woman" and "Edie (Ciao Baby)". Sonic Temple was the last album recorded with longtime bassist Jamie Stewart, who left in 1990, and the first to feature drummer Mickey Curry.

Album information
During 1988, The Cult recorded the first (14 track) demo version of this album with Eric Singer (of Kiss) on drums. Later on, they tracked a new demo version of the record (15 songs) with Chris Taylor (drummer for the Bob Rock band).
Sonic Temple marked the first time the band worked with Bob Rock, who would later produce The Cult, Beyond Good and Evil, Choice of Weapon and Hidden City. The album reached the Cult's highest chart position in the US, peaking at #10 on the Billboard 200 charts, and was certified Platinum by the RIAA in 1990.

The album cover features guitarist Billy Duffy with his Gibson Les Paul, partially obscuring a picture of vocalist Ian Astbury. The back cover features bassist Jamie Stewart, and an additional illustration on the insert, from left to right, features Astbury, Duffy, and Stewart.

On 4 October 2019, Sonic Temple was re-released as a 5-CD box set and as a 2 LP/1 cassette box set, with a different cover, the original album digitally remastered, numerous rarities, a live album recorded at London Wembley Arena and a comprehensive booklet featuring rare photos and background info on the album and the band. The LP/cassette edition has a limited release of 3500 copies worldwide.

Critical reception

The album received mixed reviews, with some interpreting the change in sound positively and some negatively. John Leland of The New York Times deemed Sonic Temple "both [the Cult's] most conventional album and its most convincing", continuing: "Using a few simple riffs and images, the Cult creates an entire environment, one more exciting and stimulating than our own. Bob Rock, the album's producer, washes blunt, powerful sound over the broadness of most of the band's strokes. Sonic Temple makes a virtue of its lack of subtlety." In a less enthusiastic review for The Village Voice, Robert Christgau wrote: "Having risen from cultdom as a joke metal band metal fans were too dumb to get, they transmute into a dumb metal band. Dumb was the easy part. Ha ha." Los Angeles Times critic Chris Willman lambasted the album as "stupid". In his book Perfect from Now On, writer John Sellers criticised the Cult for "emulating a hair-metal band" on Sonic Temple, commenting that "the Cult had moved from the hearts of alternative-music fans to the Walkmans of Warrant disciples—completely unacceptable." Karen Douthwaite of Hi-Fi News & Record Review noticed that the band "recycling the same riffs for the last few albums" and "guitar sound intensified and metallized to AC/DC proportions.". Parke Puterbaugh of Stereo Review considered that the band "borrows its inspiration" from Led Zeppelin, Queen and other AOR heroes from the hard rock Seventies, but "there's something perversely addictive about this music, with its upfront aggression and its slow-motion orgasms of drums and guitars building to a raunchy climax."

Accolades

Track listing
All tracks written by Ian Astbury and Billy Duffy.

"Sun King" – 6:09
"Fire Woman" – 5:11
"American Horse" – 5:19
"Edie (Ciao Baby)" – 4:46
"Sweet Soul Sister" – 5:08
"Soul Asylum" – 7:26
"New York City" – 4:41
"Automatic Blues" – 3:51
"Soldier Blue" – 4:36
"Wake Up Time for Freedom" – 5:17

Bonus tracks
 "Medicine Train" – 4:42 (On CD, in some countries, cassette release, and 30th Anniversary LP)
 "The River" (Only on Russian, Eastern European, and 30th Anniversary LP pressings)
 “Bleeding Heart Graffiti” (On 30th Anniversary LP)
 “Messin’ Up The Blues” (On 30th Anniversary LP)
 “Fire Woman (NYC Rock Mix)” (On 30th Anniversary LP)
 “Edie (Ciao Baby) (Acoustic)” (On 30th Anniversary LP)
 "Lay Down your Gun" (Version two) (Only on Russian and Eastern European pressings)

Saudi Arabian version
There was a Saudi Arabian version released, with the track listing expanded (although "Soul Asylum" had been removed) and slightly rearranged:

"Sun King"
"Fire Woman"
"American Horse"
"Edie (Ciao Baby)"
"Sweet Soul Sister"
"NYC"
"Automatic Blues"
"Soldier Blue"
"Wake Up Time for Freedom"
"Medicine Train"
"Electric Ocean"
"King Contrary Man"
"Born to Be Wild"
"Outlaw"

Personnel
The Cult
Ian Astbury – vocals, percussion
Billy Duffy – guitar
Jamie Stewart – bass guitar, keyboards
Mickey Curry – drums
Additional personnel
Eric Singer - drums during first demo version of Sonic Temple 1988
Chris Taylor - drums during second demo version of Sonic Temple 1988
Iggy Pop – backing vocals on "New York City"
John Webster – keyboards
Bob Buckley – string arrangement on "Edie (Ciao Baby)"
Technical
Engineered and mixed by Mike Fraser

Charts

Certifications

References

1989 albums
Albums produced by Bob Rock
Albums recorded at Little Mountain Sound Studios
Beggars Banquet Records albums
The Cult albums
Glam metal albums
Sire Records albums